Commune nouvelle d'Arrou (literally New Commune of Arrou) is a commune in the department of Eure-et-Loir, north-central France. The municipality was established on 1 January 2017 by merger of the former communes of Arrou (the seat), Boisgasson, Châtillon-en-Dunois, Courtalain, Langey and Saint-Pellerin.

Population

See also 
Communes of the Eure-et-Loir department

References 

Communes of Eure-et-Loir